Urochroa is a genus of hummingbird containing two recently-split species.

Taxonomy
The genus Urochroa was introduced in 1856 by the English ornithologist John Gould to accommodate the rufous-gaped hillstar which is thus the type species. The genus name combines the Ancient Greek oura meaning "tail" with khroa meaning "colour" or "complexion".

The green-backed hillstar was formerly considered to be a subspecies of the rufous-gaped hillstar.

Species
The genus contains two species.

References

External links
 
 

Birds of the Ecuadorian Andes
Taxonomy articles created by Polbot